Steve Parker is an artist and musician in Austin, TX. He is the winner of the Rome Prize, the Tito's Prize, a Fulbright Fellowship, and grants from the National Endowment for the Arts.

Work 
Steve Parker uses sculpture, sound, and performance to create communal, democratic works that examine history and behavior. Futurist Listening, at the CUE Art Foundation curated by Marcela Guerrero, featured sonic headwear, acoustic sculptures built from brass instruments, and graphic scores that utilized World War II  tactics like jamming signals, coded messages, and warning sirens, reimagining them in sculptural form as tools for present-day protest and deception. WAR TUBA RECITAL, featured sculptural work inspired by the role of sound in conflict. In this exhibition, he drew from the work of Dr. Seuss, the WWII Ghost Army, and acoustic location to make a series of interactive sculptures. Grackle Call was a multi-media soundwalk that took audiences to the roosting locations of the great-tailed grackle. The work mimicked a birding experience, where audiences were provided with binoculars, iPods, and a printed program guide that guided  them to  performances, installations, radio stories, and soundscapes. In 2016, he composed Bat/Man, a participatory composition for bat echolocation, conch shells, funnel pipes, megaphone choir, and echolocation devices for the Fusebox Festival.

In 2019, he was commissioned by KMFA to create a long term installation called Sound Garden in the radio station's new building.

Parker is the curator of SoundSpace at the Blanton Museum of Art.

Selected exhibitions 

 Foghorn Elegy, an installation of foghorns and communication tower about defunct forms of nautical communication commissioned by The Contemporary Austin, 2021
 Futurist Listening at Rich Mix, London, UK, 2021
 Sanctus, at the American Academy in Rome, 2021
 Texas Biennial, McNay Art Museum, 2021
 Sound Garden installation at radio station KMFA, 2020
 Futurist Listening, an exhibition about the role of listening in surveillance and conflict at the CUE Art Foundation, New York, NY, 2020
 Tubascope, an interactive listening tower based on WWII acoustic locators commissioned by the City of Ketchum

Performer 
Parker is the trombonist for Ensemble Signal, a contemporary classical ensemble based in New York City. He has premiered over 200 new works for trombone, often including electronics and extended techniques. He is a professor at the University of Texas at San Antonio.

Partial discography 

 Nearly Extinct with Henry Kaiser / Steve Parker / Damon Smith / Chris Cogburn (Balance Point, 2016)
 Shelter with Ensemble Signal and Bang on a Can (Cantaloupe Music, 2013)

References

External links 
 Artist website
 Faculty profile

American sound artists
Interdisciplinary artists
American trombonists
Living people
American male jazz musicians
Year of birth missing (living people)